The 2001 D.C. United season was the clubs' seventh year of existence, as well as their sixth season in Major League Soccer.

For the second-consecutive year in franchise history, United failed to qualify for the MLS Cup Playoffs, previously winning in making the finals in the four tournaments beforehand. The club also played in the CONCACAF Giants Cup where they finished second to Club America of Mexico.

United's MLS regular season was cut short after 26 matches due to the September 11 attacks, it would the last time a United game was suspended until the COVID-19 pandemic in 2020.

Background 

The 2000 D.C. United season marked the first time in club history that the franchise failed to not only reach the MLS Cup final, but failed to make the MLS Cup Playoffs altogether. Throughout the club's fifth ever campaign, United posted a losing record of eight wins, eighteen losses and six ties; earning the eleventh best record in the twelve-team league. Despite the poor performance, Dutch manager, Thomas Rongen, remained at the helm of the club coaching staff.

Review

Competitions

Major League Soccer

Standings

Conference

Overall 

 – Miami Fusion F.C. were originally allocated a spot in the 2002 CONCACAF Champions' Cup for winning the Supporters' Shield, but since the club disbanded, the spot was allocated to D.C. United for being the CONCACAF Giants Cup runner-up.

Results summary

Results by round

Match results

U.S. Open Cup

CONCACAF Giants Cup

Friendlies

Statistics

Transfers

In

Out

Loan in

Loan out

See also 
 D.C. United
 List of D.C. United seasons

2001
Dc United
Dc United
2001 in sports in Washington, D.C.